NK Marsonia is a Croatian football club based in the city of Slavonski Brod. They currently play in the third division Treća HNL.

NK Marsonia was founded in 1909. From 1945 to 1962 the club was called NK Radnički Brod, and then BSK from 1962 to 1992 before the club's original name was restored.

NK Marsonia last played in the top flight 1.HNL in 2004, finishing last and suffering relegation.

On August 1, 2011 NK Marsonia merged with MV Croatia to form NK Marsonia 1909 which will compete in Croatian second division. NK Marsonia will continue functioning as the new club's second team.

Some of Marsonia's notable former players include Mario Mandžukić, Ivica Olić, Veldin Karić, Boris Živković and Josip Weber.

Honours 

 Druga HNL - North:
Winners (1): 1993–94
Winners (1): 2002–03

 Treća HNL - East:
Winners (1): 1998–99
Winners (1): 2019–20

Recent seasons

References

 
Association football clubs established in 1909
Football clubs in Croatia
Football clubs in Brod-Posavina County
1909 establishments in Croatia